Dacetuzumab (also known as SGN-40 or huS2C6) is a humanized monoclonal antibody being developed for the treatment of CD40-positive cancers like non-Hodgkin's lymphoma and hematological malignancies.

This drug was developed by Seattle Genetics, Inc.

References 

Monoclonal antibodies for tumors
Experimental drugs